Phenakospermum is a monotypic genus in the family Strelitziaceae. Only one species is recognized, Phenakospermum guyannense, native to Suriname, French Guiana and the eastern Amazon River basin. This plant grows to over 10 m in height but can be felled with a single blow with a machete.

Although not as prized as the ornamental Traveler's palm (in the same family), P. guyannense is used locally in Brazil as a landscape element. The broad leaves are used to wrap fish in Benevides, Brazil, especially when Calathea leaves (Marantaceae) are not available.

Previously, this genus was included in the now exclusively old world genus Ravenala.

References 

 
 

Monotypic Zingiberales genera
Strelitziaceae
Trees of Bolivia
Trees of Suriname
Trees of Guyana
Trees of Peru
Trees of Brazil
Trees of Colombia
Trees of Ecuador
Trees of Venezuela
Trees of French Guiana
Taxa named by Friedrich Anton Wilhelm Miquel